Tullylish is a small village, townland (of 513 acres) and civil parish in County Down, Northern Ireland. It sits on the River Bann, along the main road between the towns of Banbridge and Portadown. In the 2001 Census it had a population of 105 people. It lies within the civil parish of Tullylish and Banbridge District.

People 
John Butler Yeats (artist and writer, 1839–1922), father of William Butler Yeats and Jack Butler Yeats, was brought up in Tullylish at Vicarage Farm, Lawrencetown.
Jeremy Irons (actor); the BBC series Who Do You Think You Are? revealed that Jeremy Irons family originated from Tullylish Parish, Gilford.
Jane Whiteside (1855–1875),  notable New Zealand tightrope dancer, gymnast and magician, was born in Tullylish
 Rev. Arthur Connell (1821-1899), Church of Ireland priest served Tullylish before moving to St. Mark's where he and his daughter helped found what became Manchester City F.C.
John O'Dowd (1967-), Sinn Féin MLA for Upper Bann and former Minister of Education.

Sport 
Lawrencetown is home to Tullylish G.A.A club, which was originally known as 'St. Patrick's G.A.A Club' when it was formed in July 1944.

Civil parish of Tullylish
The civil parish is mainly within the historic barony of Iveagh Lower, Upper Half with one townland (Tullyrain) in the barony of Iveagh Lower, Lower Half. It also contains the villages of Gilford, Lawrencetown and Bleary.

Townlands
The civil parish contains the following townlands:

Ballydugan
Ballymacanallen
Ballynagarrick
Bleary
Clare
Coose
Drumaran
Drumhorc
Drummiller
Drumnascamph
Kernan
Knocknagore
Lenaderg
Lisnafiffy
Loughans
Moyallan
Mullabrack
Tullylish
Tullyrain

See also
List of civil parishes of County Down
List of townlands in County Down

References 

NI Neighbourhood Information System
Tullylish Parish
Tullylish - Its Celtic Origins
Ulster History Circle - John Butler Yeats
Tullylish G.A.A Club

External links 
Tullylish Parish website

Villages in County Down
Townlands of County Down
 
Banbridge District Council